The Tren Maya (sometimes also Mayan Train or Maya Train) is a  intercity railway in Mexico that will traverse the Yucatán Peninsula; construction began in June 2020 and is scheduled to be completed by 2024. The railway begins in Palenque in Chiapas and travels northeast towards Cancún in Quintana Roo via two routes that encircle the peninsula. The project aims to connect tourist destinations in the Caribbean with lesser-known sites inland, including historic Mayan sites from which it derives its name.

History
The Mayan Train project was announced in September 2018 by Mexican president-elect Andrés Manuel López Obrador, following earlier proposals to build a shorter  line. Previous presidential administrations had also proposed their own high-speed rail projects, but were unsuccessful in attaining funding. It would use existing right of way from Ferrosur as well as new tracks constructed through the jungle. The project was derided by political opposition groups as a stunt for López Obrador, who had also cancelled a major airport project in Mexico City favored by his predecessor. The Zapatista Army of National Liberation announced that it would oppose the project.

December 2019 consultation
On 15 November 2019, President López Obrador declared that a referendum on the Mayan Train would be held on 15 December 2019 in Chiapas, Tabasco, Campeche, Yucatán, and Quintana Roo.

The weekend of 15–16 December 2019, 92.3% of the people who participated in the consultation voted in favor, while 7.4% voted against the proposal. 100,940 people voted, 2.36% of the 3,536,000 registered voters in the 84 municipalities affected.

The Mexican Office of the United Nations High Commissioner for Human Rights criticized the vote. They pointed out that voters were provided with only the positive effects of the project (improved attention to water supplies, health, education, employment, housing, environmental protection, and culture) but were not informed of the negative effects. The Human Rights Commission also criticized the translations of the material used, the short period of time for the election, and low turnout, particularly among indigenous women. They noted that many potential voters did not have the financial resources to travel to the voting locations, and that the majority of voters were municipal employees. The government rejected the criticisms, stating the consultation met international standards.

Progreso extension
In June 2022 Interior Secretary Adán Augusto López Hernández announced a planned extension to Progreso and Umán in Yucatán.

Funding
Funding for the project will come primarily from a tourism tax levied in the region, as well as funds diverted from other programs, including the Mexican Grand Prix.

An alternative study by a public policy think tank in 2019 estimated the cost of the project would be 480 billion pesos (US$25.3 billion), supported by the 90 percent cost overrun on the Toluca–Mexico City railway project. In October 2021 Fonatur revised the construction estimate to 200 billion pesos.

In October 2020 the estimated total cost of the project, including 30 years of operating and maintenance but not including electrification, was about 321 billion pesos.

The Secretariat of Tourism will receive a 647.1% increase in its budget for 2021 (MXN $38,613.4 million), of which 94% is destined for the Mayan Train.

In December 2020 president López Obrador announced that the armed forces would operate three sections of the route, and that profits would be used to strengthen finances for pensioners and retirees of the armed forces. In March 2021 Fonatur general director Rogelio Jiménez Pons said that the military would own the entire route, not just the three sections, and would receive all of the profits.

Pons stated in September 2021 that the cost of a single trip for locals, for the section that goes from Cancún to Playa del Carmen, will be around 50 pesos. Tourists will be expected to pay between 800 to 1000 pesos for the same trip. When explaining the difference in price, he stated that the tourist will have additional services such as restaurants.

Construction
On 16 December 2018, president López Obrador conducted a Mayan ritual to commemorate the start of construction on the Mayan Train project. The railway will also accommodate local passenger traffic and freight shipments in addition to tourist functions. The first phase of the project is anticipated to open in the late 2020s, but tourism officials in the region have proposed accelerating work for a 2023 opening.

The route consists of seven sections. Section I runs from Palenque to Escárcega (228 km); section II from Escárcega to Calkiní (235 km); section III from Calkiní to Izamal (172 km); section IV from Izamal to Cancún (257 km); section V from Cancún to Tulum (121 km); section VI from Tulum to Bacalar (254 km); and section VII from Bacalar to Escárcega (287 km).

Business leaders in Mérida, Yucatán expressed their support on 31 January 2020 for building four kilometers of the railway underground as it passes through the city of Mérida. In this way, the train will not threaten the city's historic center. They are also optimistic that the tourist train, in combination with improvements in energy, airports, and seaports, will make the region economically competitive with the North and the Bajío. Fonatur later announced that the train would initially not stop in Mérida, but near a hacienda 8 km away. They said that by 2025 the station will relocate to La Plancha Park in Mérida.

Construction began in June 2020. The construction companies are Mota-Engil México SAPI and China Communications Construction Company LTD for stretch one (Plenque-Escárcega), Operadora CICSA and FCC Construcción for stretch two (Escárcega-Calkiní), Construcciones Urales and GAMI Ingeniería e Instalaciones for stretch three (Calkiní-Izamal), and Grupo ICA for stretch four (Izamal–Cancún). In September 2020 Fonatur rejected a proposal of investment firm BlackRock for the fifth stretch (125 km) of the project, including improvements to the Tulum–Cancún highway.

In February 2021 Fonatur awarded a contract to Acciona and Grupo México for 60.3 km of electrified double rail tracks for section five between Playa del Carmen and Tulum.

As of January 2021 plans call for diesel-electric trains running at up to 160 km/h. In May 2021 Fonatur contracted with a consortium headed by Alstom to supply rolling stock and related equipment. The rolling stock will be manufactured at Alstom's factory in Ciudad Sahagún. The contract also includes European Train Control System signalling and control equipment.

López Obrador has said the project will be completed prior to the end of his term in 2024. A market survey conducted by Fonatur, PricewaterhouseCoopers and other consultants in 2019 found that a majority of 21 construction companies consider this too fast, an unreasonable time to construct so much new rail, and others have expressed fear of a disaster caused by substandard work, such as the May 2021 Mexico City Metro overpass collapse. In January 2022, to speed up construction, the route was changed to no longer enter Playa del Carmen. , 10% of the project had been completed. This had increased to 25% by February 2022.

Opposition
Environmental and indigenous rights activists objected to construction of new tracks through the jungle.

On the 26th anniversary of its armed uprising, 1 January 2020, the Zapatista Army of National Liberation expressed its opposition to the project and declared that the consultation provided only positive information to voters prior to voting.

Groups close to the National Indigenous Congress (CNI) plan to seek injunctions against the train project and other megaprojects in the region. The CNI is looking at three-pronged action: social awareness campaigns, media campaigns, and legal actions. On 28 January 2020 a judge in Campeche issued a temporary injunction against construction of the railway because was approved in a "simulated consultation." In a visit to the city of Campeche, President López Obrador defended the train and pointed out that not only had the train received its greatest support in the state of Campeche, but also that more than half the route would run through the state—worth MXN $60 billion of the $130 billion the government plans to invest in total. He said the section from Escárcega to Cancún should be open for tourist, passenger, and freight traffic in 2023, but that the route will not pass through the Calakmul Biosphere Reserve.

In November 2020 the Regional Indigenous Council of Xpujil delivered a petition with 268,000 signatures to the Campeche Ministry of Environment and Natural Resources asking that the project be suspended because of environmental concerns. Residents of Chocholá, Mérida, and Izamal, in Yucatán obtained a temporary delay in construction in January 2021 until Fonatur and SEMARNAT report on an environmental impact assessment.

On 3 March 2021 an injunction was filed by 80 people from Campeche who fear eviction from their homes. The First District Court in Campeche granted them the provisional suspension. Yucatán's fourth district court also ordered a stop to construction. The brought the total number of injunctions filed in the Yucatan Peninsula to 16 in March 2021, increasing to at least 25 by January 2022. Most of the injunctions have been filed by indigenous collectives who consider the project to be an environmental disaster. The injunctions have had little effect, and construction continues. López Obrador has criticized the saliency in opposition to the train as a partisan attempt to halt his administration's infrastructure projects.

A group of celebrities, including comedian Eugenio Derbez, singers Rubén Albarrán and Natalia Lafourcade, and actress Kate del Castillo, as part of the Sélvame del Tren ("Save me from the Train", a play on words between Sálvame meaning Save Me, and Selva meaning jungle) campaign, has expressed opposition to the train. 

In July 2022 residents of Chemax barricaded surrounding roads, bringing construction to a halt. They say the government has violated its agreement by clearing the jungle and failing to provide promised infrastructure.

Environmental concerns 
As of January 2021 workers and archeologists had uncovered more than 8,000 ancient artifacts and structures during construction.

The National Alliance for Conservation of the Jaguar has identified twelve wildlife corridors that could be constructed to mitigate the situation for the jaguars that live in the area.

The Centro Mexicano de Derecho Ambiental environmental group has accused Fonatur of deforestation along the route, not accounted for in the environmental impact assessment and without acquiring the necessary permits. In November 2021 the Interior Department exempted Tren Maya and other infrastructure projects from environmental review.

Original plans called for electric locomotives on the trains. In June 2020 the government announced a switch to diesel to reduce costs, then in August 2020 they announced that half the route, from Mérida to Chetumal via Cancún, would be electrified.

In March 2022 Greenpeace organizers tied themselves to heavy machinery as a protest against construction in Quintana Roo that involves cutting down the jungle without environmental studies having been made.

See also 

 Rail transport in Mexico

References

Further reading

Proposed railway lines
Railway lines in Mexico
Yucatán Peninsula
2023 in rail transport
Proposed rail infrastructure in Mexico